Nai Chung is a countryside and a village in northeastern New Territories, Hong Kong. It is located at the east of Ma On Shan, partly lying within the Ma On Shan Country Park. Nai Chung lies in a larger area collectively known as Shap Sze Heung.

Administration
Despite its proximity to the neighbouring areas administered by Sha Tin and Sai Kung districts, Nai Chung is actually administered by Tai Po District. It is covered by the Sai Kung North constituency of the Tai Po District Council, which is currently represented by Ben Tam Yi-pui. Nai Chung is a recognized village under the New Territories Small House Policy.

Features
It contains barbecue sites, which are popular destinations of school picnics, and some restaurants that serve Thai and Indian food.

See also
 Sai O, another village of Shap Sze Heung, located directly West of Nai Chung
 Che Ha and Kwun Hang, two villages of Shap Sze Heung, located directly East of Nai Chung

References

External links

 Delineation of area of existing village Nai Chung (Sai Kung North) for election of resident representative (2019 to 2022)

Places in Hong Kong
Villages in Tai Po District, Hong Kong
Sai Kung North